Bossiaea cucullata is a species of flowering plant in the family Fabaceae and is endemic to Western Australia. It is a dense, many-branched shrub with narrow-winged cladodes, leaves reduced to dark brown scales, and yellow and deep red or pale greenish-yellow flowers.

Description

Taxonomy and naming
Bossiaea cucullata was first formally described in 1998 by James Henderson Ross in the journal Muelleria from specimens collected on the western side of Lake King in 1997. The specific epithet (cucullata) means "hooded", referring to the upper sepal lobes.

Distribution and habitat
This bossiaea grows in deep sand around the edge of salt lakes in the Avon Wheatbelt, Coolgardie, Mallee and Murchison biogeographic regions of Western Australia.

Conservation status
Bossiaea cucullata is classified as "not threatened" by the Government of Western Australia Department of Parks and Wildlife.

References

cucullata
Eudicots of Western Australia
Plants described in 1998